Seticosta triangulifera is a species of moth of the family Tortricidae. It is found in Tungurahua Province, Ecuador.

The wingspan is 16 mm. The forewings are brown with cream markings, dorsum and veins. The hindwings are brown.

Etymology
The species name refers to the triangular lobe of the valve and is derived from Latin triangulum (meaning triangle and ferre (meaning to carry).

References

Moths described in 2004
Seticosta